Debit is a white wine grape variety grown primarily along the Northern & Central Dalmatian Coast of Croatia.  The fruit are medium-sized golden yellow color and in clusters of medium size or large.

History
According to the Vitis International Variety Catalogue the currently believed to have originated in Croatia. However, the old name of "Puljižinac" suggests that the origin may originally be Italian.

The white Italian grape variety bombino bianco has Debit as one of its confirmed synonyms but it is not known if the two varieties are related.

References

External links
Secret Dalmatia Blog "Grapes of North Dalmatia – Debit and Babic" September 9, 2009

White wine grape varieties
Grape varieties of Croatia
Dalmatian grape varieties
Croatian wine